Dunstan is a single-member electoral district for the South Australian House of Assembly, covering the inner eastern suburbs of Beulah Park, College Park, Evandale, Firle, Hackney, Joslin, Kensington, Kensington Park, Kensington Gardens, Kent Town, Marden, Maylands, Norwood, Payneham, Payneham South, Royston Park, St Morris, St Peters, Stepney, and Trinity Gardens.

The electorate was created in the 2012 redistribution of electoral boundaries.  It was essentially a reconfigured version of Norwood, with the electoral boundaries remaining unchanged.  It is named after the 35th Premier of South Australia, Don Dunstan, who represented Norwood for Labor from 1953 to 1979. The 2010 election was the first time that Labor was in government without holding Norwood.

Following the 2016 redistribution, the cityside suburbs of Rose Park and Dulwich, previously in Bragg, were added to Dunstan.

Liberal MP Steven Marshall, the last member for Norwood, successfully transferred to Dunstan at the 2014 state election while serving as Leader of the Opposition. He was reelected with a healthy swing in 2018, becoming Premier. 

Ahead of the 2022 state election, Dunstan was pushed further east, picking up the Kensington towns while losing Felixstow, Glynde, Rose Park and Dulwich. This boosted the Liberal margin to a notional 7.1 percent, making Dunstan a fairly safe Liberal seat on paper. At that election, the Liberals were heavily defeated after only one term. Marshall himself was nearly defeated, suffering a swing of almost seven percent. As a result, Dunstan is now the most marginal seat in the legislature, with Marshall sitting on a majority of 0.5 percent.

Members for Dunstan

Election results

See also
 Electoral results for the district of Norwood

Notes

References
 ECSA profile for Dunstan: 2018
 ABC profile for Dunstan: 2018
 Poll Bludger profile for Dunstan: 2018

Electoral districts of South Australia
2014 establishments in Australia